A. T. Laurian National College is a public day high school in Botoșani, Romania, located at 19 Nicolae Iorga Street.

The school was founded as a gymnasium in 1859. When classes began that September, there were two teachers handling all subjects, twelve pupils, four fir benches, a table, an elm chair and a blackboard. In January 1868, two upper-level grades were added, and in the ensuing years, the school became a center of local cultural activity. Elie Radu was an early alumnus. A new building was inaugurated in 1885, at which point the school was named after August Treboniu Laurian and elevated to a high school. Among the individuals who studied there from the 1880s until the eve of World War I were Nicolae Iorga, Octav Onicescu, Simion Sanielevici, Ion Th. Simionescu, Ludovic Dauș, Constantin Gane and Barbu Lăzăreanu. Later attendees included Victor Tufescu, Alexandru Graur and Lucien Goldmann.

World War I seriously impacted school life; between 1917 and 1922, teaching took place in improvised locations and finally in the former building of another school. The old building was repaired in 1922, and the institution flourished during the interwar period. In the 1927–1928 school year, there were 521 pupils, of whom 69% were Christian and 31% Jewish. In 1948, the new communist regime changed the institution's name to Secondary School No. 1; Laurian was restored in 1960. During the 1960s and '70s, the school saw the establishment of a periodical, a museum and annual reunions, as well as material improvements. In 1999, a decade after the Romanian Revolution, it was granted the title of national college.

The school building is listed as a historic monument by Romania's Ministry of Culture and Religious Affairs.

Notes

External links
 Official site

Educational institutions established in 1859
School buildings completed in 1885
Schools in Botoșani County
Historic monuments in Botoșani County
Botoșani
National Colleges in Romania
1859 establishments in the Ottoman Empire